A Fight for What Is Right was the third album by Canadian punk rock band Closet Monster, released in 1999.

Track listing

"Uniqualist Me"
"I Have No Mouth but I Must Scream"
"Counter Clockwise"
"Friday Night"
"Higher Education"
"One Capitalist Always Kills Many (Fat Cats)"
"Prison of Your Mind"
"Nausea"
"One Word"
"Heart Strings"
"Starving"
"A Revolutionary Dream"
"Suburbia"
"Common Devotion"

1999 albums
Closet Monster albums